The 1973 international cricket season extended from May to August 1973.

Season overview

June

New Zealand in England

July

West Indies in England

References

1973 in cricket